"Eaea" is a song by Spanish singer Blanca Paloma, released on 20 December 2022. The song is scheduled to represent Spain in the Eurovision Song Contest 2023 after winning Benidorm Fest 2023, Spain's national final for that year's Eurovision Song Contest.

Composition 
In an analysis from Eurovision fansite Wiwibloggs by writer Luis Fuster, the song represents a "chant to her late grandmother", who had inspired much of Blanca Paloma's music. According to Fuster, the song features a celebration of female ancestors' power and strength.

Eurovision Song Contest

Benidorm Fest 2023 
Benidorm Fest 2023 was the national final for Spain to select their entry for the Eurovision Song Contest 2023. The competition consists of two semi-finals and one final. In total, 18 candidate songs compete divided between the two semifinals, with nine competing in each one. In each semifinal, the four songs with the most votes among the professional juries (50%), the demographic panel (25%) and the televote (25%), go directly to the final. During the final, the eight qualified songs perform again, with the same voting system as in the semi-finals."Eaea" competed in the second semi-final, proceeding to win the semi-final with 167 points.

In the final, "Eaea" was considered a favorite to win Benidorm Fest 2023 in numerous Eurovision fan polls, including ones on Wiwibloggs and ESCUnited. "Eaea" was competing for the triumph of the Festival with the other great favorite by the public, the song "Quiero arder" by the Canarian singer Agoney. "Eaea" would earn a combined total of 169 points in the final, winning by a margin of 24 points, earning the Spanish spot for the Eurovision Song Contest 2023.

At Eurovision 
According to Eurovision rules, all nations with the exceptions of the host country and the "Big Five" (France, Germany, Italy, Spain and the United Kingdom) are required to qualify from one of two semi-finals in order to compete for the final; the top ten countries from each semi-final progress to the final.  As a member of the "Big Five", Spain has automatically qualified to compete in the final.

References 

2022 songs
2022 singles
Eurovision songs of Spain
Eurovision songs of 2023
New flamenco
Spanish-language songs
Universal Music Group singles